Mount Chevreux is a mountain,  high, standing  southeast of Leroux Bay on the west coast of Graham Land in Antarctica. It was discovered by the French Antarctic Expedition, 1908–10, under Jean-Baptiste Charcot, who named it for Edouard Chevreux, a French zoologist.

References 

Mountains of Graham Land
Graham Coast